Chu is the pinyin romanization of several different Chinese family names, which including 楚 Chǔ, 儲/储 Chǔ, 褚 Chǔ, 觸/触 Chù, etc. In the Wade-Giles romanization system, Chu is also a transliteration for 朱 (Zhu in Hanyu Pinyin), also can refer to several Chinese family names. In Hong Kong, Macao, this is also the spelling for the surname 朱. In Taiwan, the last name Chu is also used to refer to 朱(Zhu in pinyin), 曲(Qu in pinyin), 祝(Zhù in Pinyin), etc.

Notable people named Chu

楚 Chǔ

The name is transliterated as Sở in Vietnamese. Some people think this surname originated from Viscount Xiong Yi, the founder of Chu State in Western Zhou Dynasty. After Qin conquered Chu, the royal family of Chu took their countries’ name as their surname.

Chu Liuxiang, fictional protagonist of Gu Long's Chu Liuxiang Series
Chu Qing (1923–2016),  politician
Arthur Chu, Taiwanese American columnist and former Jeopardy! contestant

儲/储 Chǔ

11th on the Hundred Family Surnames.
Chu Anping,  scholar and liberal journalist in the 20th century
Chu Bo (born 1944), politician

褚 Chǔ

It is the 11th name on the Hundred Family Surnames poem.
Chu Suiliang, politician and calligrapher in Tang Dynasty
Chu Shijian (1928–2019), businessman
Chu Yupu (1887–1929) Chinese general who served under Yuan Shikai and later Zhang Zongchang

See also
Zhu

Chinese-language surnames
Multiple Chinese surnames